AbeBooks is an e-commerce global online marketplace with seven websites that offer books, fine art, and collectables from sellers in over 50 countries. Launched in 1996, it specialises in used, rare and out-of-print books. AbeBooks has been a subsidiary of Amazon since 2008.

History
In 1995, AbeBooks was founded by Rick and Vivian Pura, and Keith and Cathy Waters. It was incorporated in 1995 and launched its websites in 1996, initially including listings for only four bookstores. The company name "Abebooks" is derived from their original name, "Advanced Book Exchange". From the late 1990s to 2005, AbeBooks had reseller agreements with eBay, Half.com, Barnes & Noble.com, BibliOZ.com and Amazon.com, allowing AbeBooks to market and sell booksellers' books through those channels; these agreements were dissolved in 2005. AbeBooks currently has a reseller agreement only with Amazon.com.

In 2001, AbeBooks acquired Germany's JustBooks GmbH online book marketplace, which helped the company expand into the German, French and British online bookselling markets. In 2002, the founding partners were bought out by German media company Hubert Burda Media. In 2004, the company expanded its model to include new books, and acquired the Spanish company IberLibro, to better serve Spanish language markets. In 2005, it acquired BookFinder.com, an American book price comparison service. In 2006, the company acquired Fillz, a book-inventory and order-management company, and purchased a 40% stake in LibraryThing in May, a social networking and book cataloging website for bibliophiles.

In June 2008, AbeBooks was awarded the British Columbia Technology Industry Association Impact Award for Leadership in Social Responsibility for its charitable activities, literacy initiatives, and commitment to environmental friendliness in its business practices. In December that year, the company was sold to Amazon. In May 2010, it launched the AbeBooks Channel Program to provide its booksellers with the opportunity to list their books for sale on Amazon.com. The Channel Program was permanently closed on June 16, 2014.

In 2016, Arkady Vitrouk was appointed CEO. He was previously the director of Kindle Content in Amazon's European headquarters in Luxembourg. Prior to joining Amazon, he was the CEO of the Azbooka-Atticus Publishing Group in Russia. In 2018, the company announced it would no longer fully support sellers from a number of countries, including South Korea, Hungary, and the Czech Republic. Several hundred other sellers pulled their inventories from the AbeBooks site in protest.

In 2020, Kerry Wright was appointed GM/CEO. He was previously the CTO of Abe Books from 2017 to 2020, and before that was a software development manager there from 2010 to 2017.

AbeBooks is headquartered in Victoria, British Columbia, Canada, with its European office in Düsseldorf, Germany. The company manages regional websites for North America, France, Germany, Italy, the UK and Spain. Most of its inventory consists of used books, including rare, signed, first editions or out of print books. It has been named one of British Columbia's Top Employers every year since 2008.

Most expensive sales
AbeBooks is known as an online marketplace where high-end rare and collectible items change hands. In February 2015, it recorded the most expensive sales ever at the time: a rare illustrated ornithology book was sold online for $191,000. The website periodically reports their recent high value sales.

Searchable inventory
AbeBooks' users can search across the listings of many independent bookstores, thereby allowing small, independent players to compete with bookselling superstores. Some of the member bookstores offer their books online only, while others also maintain a regular storefront.

Booksellers upload their inventory data to the AbeBooks database, specifying information about each book including condition and price. Prices are fixed (with US$1 being the minimum) and there are no auctions. Items available range from the extremely common, where there might be hundreds of copies listed, to first editions and signed books worth thousands of dollars. In addition to books, the marketplace also offers periodicals and journals, fine art such as prints and posters, vintage photographs, maps, sheet music and paper ephemera such as postcards, letters and other documents.

Sellers
Sellers pay a monthly subscription to list their books on the site, ranging from $25 to $500, depending on how many books they list. This subscription fee has been in place since at least April 2008. In addition, sellers pay a percentage fee for each book sold via the websites.

AbeBooks initially offered its services for a flat listings fee, based on the number of titles listed for sale. The model was changed in the early 2000s to include a commission on sales. In April 2006, AbeBooks started mandatory processing of MasterCard and Visa credit card transactions on behalf of its sellers and added a 5.5% charge for the provision of this service: previously this service had been optional. In 2008, AbeBooks started charging a commission of 13.5% on the cost of postage as well as the book price. Currently (2013) the commission charge is set at 8% of postage and book price.

Sellers can, within limits, set their own standard postage rates to various countries or by different carriers. Booksellers can upload their inventory using their own spreadsheet software or via the site's interface. Items that sell are mailed directly from the individual bookseller's location. Some booksellers have new books directly mailed from wholesalers or publishers. Most booksellers who list on AbeBooks also list their books on similar marketplaces such as Amazon.com.

Websites
AbeBooks's localized storefronts, which differ in language and currency, are differentiated by top-level domain and country code:

Similar websites include BookFinder.com and LibraryThing.

See also
musicMagpie
Alibris
World of Books
Better World Books
Momox
List of online booksellers

References

Sources
 
 Radio interview with Richard Davies of AbeBooks.com on Read First, Ask Later (Ep. 14)

Product searching websites
Canadian brands
Amazon (company) acquisitions
Book selling websites
Comparison shopping websites
Online marketplaces of Canada
2008 mergers and acquisitions
Online bookstores
Retail companies established in 1996
Internet properties established in 1996
1996 establishments in British Columbia